Camille-Léonie Doncieux (15 January 1847 – 5 September 1879) was the first wife of French painter Claude Monet, with whom she had two sons. She was the subject of a number of paintings by Monet, as well as Pierre-Auguste Renoir and Édouard Manet.

Early life
Camille-Léonie Doncieux was born in the town of La Guillotiere, now part of Lyons, France, on 15 January 1847. Her father, Charles Claude Doncieux, was a merchant. He moved with his wife Leonie-Françoise (née Manéchalle) Doncieux and daughter to Paris, near the Sorbonne, early in the Second French Empire (1852-1870). A few years after the birth of her sister, Geneviève-François in 1857, the family moved to Batignolles, now a part of the northwestern section of Paris. Batignolles was popular with artists.

While in her teens, Doncieux began work as a model. She met Monet, seven years her senior, in 1865 and became his model posing for numerous paintings. She was Monet's mistress, living in poverty at the beginning of his career. His aunt and father did not approve of the relationship with Camille. During Camille's pregnancy with their first son, Monet left her in Paris and stayed at his aunt's country estate to protect the monthly cheque that he received from the family and give the appearance that he was no longer in a relationship with Camille. She was left behind in Paris without funds for her care.

Marriage and children

In Paris on 8 August 1867, Camille Doncieux gave birth to Jean, her first son with Claude Monet. Claude, who had spent the summer in Sainte-Adresse visiting his father and aunt Sophie Lecadre, returned to Paris for the birth and stayed for several days afterwards before returning to Sainte-Adresse. He returned to Paris at the end of the year for the holidays and stayed in the cold one-room apartment that Camille shared with Jean. In 1868 Monet went to live with Camille and Jean in Paris, hiding the fact from his father and aunt who thought he had abandoned "his mistress and child". To escape his creditors and live in a less expensive place, in the spring the three moved to Gloton, a small scenic village near Bennecourt. They were thrown out of the inn where they were staying for non-payment. Camille and Jean were able to stay with someone in the country, while Monet tried to obtain monies for survival.

Camille and Monet were married on 28 June 1870 in the 8th arrondissement of Paris during a civil ceremony. Painter Gustave Courbet was a witness. Although Monet's father was not present because he did not approve of his marriage, Camille's parents attended the ceremony. Upon her marriage, Camille received a 1,200 franc dowry, which represented two years interest on a principal investment that she would receive upon her father's death. Her parents stipulated that the dowry money should be kept in a separate account in Camille's name. This was done to protect the money from Claude Monet's creditors. The couple took their son Jean with them on their honeymoon to Trouville-sur-Mer and stayed at the Hotel Trivoli. Continuing to avoid creditors, Monet also sought to avoid being drafted to serve during the Franco-Prussian War. He left his bride and son to go to Le Havre to visit his ailing father and then on to England, "presumably" with money given to him by his father. Camille and Jean met up with him in England in October 1870.

They lived at Bath Place, now Kensington High Street, London, by early 1871. It was here that Monet made the only painting of Camille that he made in London. Entitled Repose, she sat in a chaise longue with a book on her lap.

Ernest and Alice Hoschedé came to live with the Monets after the rich family lost their fortune due to an "extravagant lifestyle". They lived with them first in Vétheuil and then the two families moved to a larger house on the road from Vétheuil to La Roche-Guyon that would support the 12 member Hoschedé and Monet families and a "handful of servants".

Their second son, Michel was born on 17 March 1878, and Camille's poor health was further degraded.

Illness and death
Camille became ill after the Hoschedés family came to live with the Monets. Much of the money that Monet had made on the sale of his paintings was used to pay for her medical care. Alice nursed her during her illness.

On her deathbed, last rites were given by a priest on 31 August 1879. He also religiously sanctioned the Monets' civil marriage.

She died of pelvic cancer (although some sources say the cause of her death was tuberculosis, or possibly a botched abortion) on 5 September 1879 in Vétheuil. Monet painted her on her deathbed.

Art subject
She modeled for her husband on several occasions, including for the painting Camille (The Woman in the Green Dress), which received critical acclaim at the Paris salon and earned him 800 francs when sold to Arsène Houssaye. In addition to being Monet's muse and favoured model, she also modelled for Pierre-Auguste Renoir and Édouard Manet.

Paintings by Claude Monet
The following is a list of paintings made of Camille:
 Luncheon on the Grass (center), 1865
 The Walk (Bazille and Camille), 1865
 Camille with a Small Dog, 1866
 Camille or The Woman in a Green Dress, 1866
 Women in the Garden, 1866
 Interior, after Dinner, 1868
 River Scene at Bennecourt, 1868
 The Landing Stage, 1869
 Camille Sitting on the Beach at Trouville, 1870
 Camille at the Beach at Trouville, 1870
 Camille on the Beach, 1870
 Madame Monet on a Couch, 1871
 Springtime, 1872
 Lilacs in the Sun, 1872
 The Red Kerchief: Portrait of Mrs. Monet, 1873
 The Bench, 1873
 Ripose under the Lilacs, 1873
 Poppy Field near Argenteuil, 1873
 Camille Monet at a Window, Argenteuil, 1873
 The Walk near Argenteuil, 1873
 Camille and Jean Monet at the Garden of Argenteuil, 1873
 Camille in the Garden with Jean, 1873
 Woman Seated on a Bench, 1874
 The Artist's Family in the Garden, 1875
 Camille Monet and a Child in the Artist’s Garden in Argenteuil, 1875
 Madame Monet Embroidering, 1875
 Woman with a Parasol - Madame Monet and Her Son, 1875
 Rounded Flower Bed (Corbeille de fleurs), 1876
 Camille Monet in Japanese Costume, 1876
 Camille in the Garden at Argenteuil, 1876
 Woman in Garden, 1876
 In the Meadow, 1876
 The Garden, Hollyhocks, 1877
 Portrait of Camille with a bouquet of violets, 1877
 Camille on her Deathbed, 1879

Gallery

References

External links

 A brief article on Camille Doncieux

1847 births
1879 deaths
French artists' models
Muses
Claude Monet
Deaths from cancer in France